The 1984 NAIA Division I football season was the 15th season of play of the NAIA's top division for football.

The season was played from August to November 1984 and culminated in the 1984 NAIA Champion Bowl, played this year on December 15, 1984 at Estes Stadium in Conway, Arkansas on the campus of the University of Central Arkansas.

Carson–Newman and Central Arkansas played to a tie, 19–19, in the Champion Bowl and both teams were named co-national champions, Carson–Newman's second NAIA title and Central Arkansas' first.

Conference changes
 This was the final season for the Evergreen Conference, which disbanded at the end of the year after sixty-four years of football play. Most of its membership, along with several independent teams, would subsequently join the new Columbia Football League.

Conference standings

Conference champions

Postseason

See also
 1984 NAIA Division II football season
 1984 NCAA Division I-A football season
 1984 NCAA Division I-AA football season
 1984 NCAA Division II football season
 1984 NCAA Division III football season

References

 
NAIA Football National Championship